André Sá and Marcelo Melo won in the doubles competition in 2009, when the tournament was part of the ATP World Tour 250 series, but did not participate this year.Dustin Brown and Rogier Wassen defeated Hans Podlipnik-Castillo and Max Raditschnigg 3–6, 7–5, [10–7] in the final.

Seeds

Draw

Draw

References
 Doubles Draw

Austrian Open Kitzbuhel - Doubles